The Progressive Integration Party (Vooruitstrevende Integratie Partij) is a political party in the Netherlands without parliamentary representation. It seeks its voters within the ethnic minorities in the country.

Populism in the Netherlands
Political parties of minorities